The 2014 New Mexico Bowl was a college football bowl game that was played on December 20, 2014 at University Stadium in Albuquerque, New Mexico. The ninth annual New Mexico Bowl, it pitted the Utah State Aggies of the Mountain West Conference against the UTEP Miners of Conference USA. It was one of the 2014–15 bowl games that concluded the 2014 FBS football season. The game started at 12:20 p.m. MST and aired on ESPN.  Sponsored by clothing company Gildan Activewear, the game was officially known as the Gildan New Mexico Bowl.  Utah State beat UTEP by a score of 21–6.

Team selection
The game featured the Utah State Aggies of the Mountain West Conference against the UTEP Miners of Conference USA.

This was the third meeting between these two teams, with Utah State previously leading the series 2–0. The last time these two teams had met was in 1961.

Utah State Aggies

This was Utah State's first New Mexico Bowl.

UTEP Miners

This was UTEP's second New Mexico Bowl; the Miners had previously played in the 2010 game, where they lost to the BYU Cougars by a score of 52–24.  It was also the Miners' first bowl appearance since that game, where they once again attempted to get their first bowl victory since the 1967 Sun Bowl.

Game summary

Scoring summary

Source:

Statistics

References

New Mexico Bowl
New Mexico Bowl
Utah State Aggies football bowl games
UTEP Miners football bowl games
December 2014 sports events in the United States
2014 in sports in New Mexico